Ferno-Lonate Pozzolo is a railway station in Italy. Located on the Busto Arsizio–Malpensa railway, it serves the towns of Ferno and Lonate Pozzolo in Lombardy.

Services
The station is served by one every four Malpensa Express trains between Malpensa Airport and Milano Centrale, operated by Trenord, and by the S50 line of the Ticino rapid transit network, operated by TILO. Both services have hourly and clock-faced frequencies.

External links
 

Railway stations in Lombardy
Ferrovienord stations
Railway stations opened in 2009